Dominican College a Catholic grammar all-girls school in Fortwilliam Park, north Belfast, Northern Ireland.

History
The school was established in 1930 by the Dominican Sisters. It was initially established as a Catholic Commercial College for Belfast, alongside a second-level school. In 2006, the management of the school passed from the Dominican Sisters to lay management. The school is now under the Trusteeship of the Cabra Dominican Sisters, with a Board of Governors whose membership also includes parents, a teacher and appointees of the Education Authority.

In 2005 it underwent a major £13.1 million redevelopment.

The school chapel has been listed as a building of special architectural merit.

In 2017, the total student population was just over 1000, a quarter of it the sixth form.

Academics
In 2019 the school was ranked 5th out of 159 secondary schools in Northern Ireland with 91.7% of its A-level students who sat the exams in 2017/18 being awarded three A*-C grades.

In 2018 it was ranked joint ninth in Northern Ireland for its GCSE performance with 99.3% of its entrants receiving five or more GCSEs at grades A* to C, including the core subjects English and Maths.

Facilities
The modernist design of the chapel, which was built in 1964, was influenced by Le Corbusier's chapel at Ronchamp in France.

Alumnae
 Eileen Bell CBE (born 1943) - politician, Northern Ireland Assembly (MLA) for North Down from 1998 to 2007
 Marianne Elliott OBE (b. 1948) - academic historian.
 Medbh McGuckian (b. 1950) - poet
 Katie Melua (b. 1984) - Georgian-born popular singer
 Nuala McAllister (born 1989) - politician; Northern Ireland Assembly (MLA) for North Belfast from 2022

See also
 Dominicans in Ireland
 List of secondary schools in Belfast
 List of Grammar schools in Northern Ireland

References

External links

Grammar schools in Belfast
Catholic secondary schools in Northern Ireland
Educational institutions established in 1930
Private schools in Northern Ireland
Dominican schools in the United Kingdom
1930 establishments in Northern Ireland